Bradford Albert Brink (born January 20, 1965) is an American former professional baseball pitcher, who played in Major League Baseball (MLB) for the Philadelphia Phillies and San Francisco Giants (–). He attended the University of Southern California (USC).

Career
Brink was drafted in the first round (7th overall) of the 1986 Major League Baseball draft, by the Phillies. After 2-plus seasons with Philadelphia, he finished his big league career with the 1994 Giants. Brink's overall statistical totals include a win–loss record of 0–4, with an earned run average (ERA) of 3.56, and 27 strikeouts.

External links

1965 births
Living people
American expatriate baseball players in Canada
Baseball players from California
Clearwater Phillies players
Edmonton Trappers players
Maine Phillies players
Philadelphia Phillies players
Phoenix Firebirds players
Reading Phillies players
San Francisco Giants players
Scranton/Wilkes-Barre Red Barons players
Sportspeople from Roseville, California
Spartanburg Phillies players
Alaska Goldpanners of Fairbanks players
USC Trojans baseball players